Ivan Buchko or Bučko (1 October 1891 – 21 September 1974) was a Ukrainian Greek Catholic hierarch in present-day Ukraine, United States and Italy. He was the auxiliary bishop of the Ukrainian Catholic Archeparchy of Lviv from 1929 to 1940, the auxiliary bishop of the Apostolic Exarchat in the United States for the Ukrainians from 1940 to 1945 and the first Apostolic Visitator for the Ukrainians in the Western Europe from 1945 to 1971. From 20 October 1929 as titular bishop of Cadi and from 27 April 1953 as titular archbishop of Leucas.

Biography
Born in Hermaniv, Austria-Hungary Empire (present day – Tarasivka, Lviv Oblast, Ukraine) in the Ukrainian peasant family of Hryhoriy, who was a church cantor, and Horpyna in 1891. He was ordained a priest on 21 February 1915 by Bishop Lazar Mladenov for the Ukrainian Catholic Archeparchy of Lviv. He worked as a rector of the Greek-Catholic minor seminary in Lviv from 1922 to 1929.

He was appointed by the Holy See an auxiliary bishop of the Ukrainian Catholic Archeparchy of Lviv on 16 September 1929. He was consecrated to the Episcopate on 20 October 1929 in the church of Santi Sergio e Bacco in Rome. The principal consecrator was Metropolitan Andrey Sheptytsky, and the principal co-consecrators were Blessed Bishop Hryhory Khomyshyn and Blessed Bishop Josaphat Kotsylovsky. He was an Apostolic Visitator for the Ukrainians in Argentina and Brazil from 1939 to 1940 and for the Ukrainians in the Western Europe from 1945 to 1971. At the end of the Second World War, Buchko organized the escape of the entire Waffen-SS Galitsia Division to South and North America. Also with his blessing were hiding in the Ukrainian Pontifical College of Saint Josaphat in Rome from the Nazi persecution some members of the Italian resistance movement. Archbishop Buchko retired on 29 September 1971.

He participated in the Second Vatican Council as a Council Father in the 1960s. He died in Rome on 21 September 1974.

References 

1891 births
1974 deaths
People from Lviv Oblast
People from the Kingdom of Galicia and Lodomeria
Ukrainian Austro-Hungarians
20th-century Eastern Catholic bishops
Bishops of the Ukrainian Greek Catholic Church
Ukrainian emigrants to Italy
Ukrainian diaspora in Italy
Participants in the Second Vatican Council